Mike Ronay Evans (born April 5, 1959) is an American former professional boxer. In his 50 bouts he won 38 (27 ko's), lost 11 and had one draw.

Tyrell Biggs scored a 6-round unanimous decision over Evans on November 15, 1984 at Madison Square Garden in New York City in his first bout.

His 1993 fight with Michael Moorer in Reno resulted in a 10-round loss, televised on HBO.

Professional boxing record

|-
|align="center" colspan=8|38 Wins (27 knockouts, 11 decisions), 11 Losses (3 knockouts, 8 decisions), 1 Draw 
|-
| align="center" style="border-style: none none solid solid; background: #e3e3e3"|Result
| align="center" style="border-style: none none solid solid; background: #e3e3e3"|Record
| align="center" style="border-style: none none solid solid; background: #e3e3e3"|Opponent
| align="center" style="border-style: none none solid solid; background: #e3e3e3"|Type
| align="center" style="border-style: none none solid solid; background: #e3e3e3"|Round
| align="center" style="border-style: none none solid solid; background: #e3e3e3"|Date
| align="center" style="border-style: none none solid solid; background: #e3e3e3"|Location
| align="center" style="border-style: none none solid solid; background: #e3e3e3"|Notes
|-align=center
|Win
|
|align=left| Jeff Lally
|TKO
|4
|02/02/2003
|align=left| Chicago Heights, Illinois, U.S.
|align=left|
|-
|Win
|
|align=left| Stan White Johnson
|KO
|1
|30/11/2002
|align=left| LaPorte, Indiana, U.S.
|align=left|
|-
|Win
|
|align=left| Allen Smith
|KO
|4
|01/06/2002
|align=left| West Lafayette, Indiana, U.S.
|align=left|
|-
|Win
|
|align=left| Myron Killibrew
|KO
|1
|21/11/2001
|align=left| Kokomo, Indiana, U.S.
|align=left|
|-
|Win
|
|align=left| George Chamberlain
|TKO
|1
|07/11/2001
|align=left| Kansas City, Missouri, U.S.
|align=left|
|-
|Win
|
|align=left| Stan White Johnson
|KO
|1
|20/09/2001
|align=left| Davenport, Iowa, U.S.
|align=left|
|-
|Win
|
|align=left| Marcelo Aravena
|UD
|4
|14/07/1999
|align=left| Belcourt, North Dakota, U.S.
|align=left|
|-
|Win
|
|align=left| Lorenzo Boyd
|PTS
|8
|22/05/1999
|align=left| Minneapolis, Minnesota, U.S.
|align=left|
|-
|Loss
|
|align=left| Frank Bruno
|KO
|2
|13/05/1995
|align=left| Glasgow, Scotland
|align=left|
|- 
|Win
|
|align=left| Adilson Rodrigues
|KO
|7
|07/03/1995
|align=left| Santos, Brazil
|align=left|
|-
|Loss
|
|align=left| Jorge Luis Gonzalez
|KO
|2
|25/06/1994
|align=left| Las Vegas, Nevada, U.S.
|align=left|
|-
|Loss
|
|align=left| Ray Anis
|UD
|10
|07/05/1994
|align=left| Atlantic City, New Jersey, U.S.
|align=left|
|-
|Loss
|
|align=left| Michael Moorer
|UD
|10
|04/12/1993
|align=left| Reno, Nevada, U.S.
|align=left|
|-
|Win
|
|align=left| Dan Murphy
|PTS
|10
|04/09/1993
|align=left| Las Vegas, Nevada, U.S.
|align=left|
|-
|Win
|
|align=left| Gary Winmon
|TKO
|9
|10/07/1993
|align=left| Bushkill, Pennsylvania, U.S.
|align=left|
|-
|Win
|
|align=left| Chuck Gardner
|TKO
|1
|06/02/1993
|align=left| Davenport, Iowa, U.S.
|align=left|
|-
|Loss
|
|align=left| Corrie Sanders
|UD
|10
|22/08/1992
|align=left| Sun City, South Africa
|align=left|
|-
|Loss
|
|align=left| Alex Garcia
|UD
|10
|02/07/1992
|align=left| Reno, Nevada, U.S.
|align=left|
|-
|Win
|
|align=left| Lopez McGee
|KO
|5
|22/05/1992
|align=left| Countryside, Illinois, U.S.
|align=left|
|-
|Win
|
|align=left| George Harris
|TKO
|2
|24/04/1992
|align=left| Countryside, Illinois, U.S.
|align=left|
|-
|Win
|
|align=left| Andre Crowder
|KO
|1
|27/03/1992
|align=left| Countryside, Illinois, U.S.
|align=left|
|-
|Win
|
|align=left| Bruce Johnson
|TKO
|4
|24/01/1992
|align=left| Countryside, Illinois, U.S.
|align=left|
|-
|Loss
|
|align=left| Marshall Tillman
|SD
|10
|03/08/1991
|align=left| Biloxi, Mississippi, U.S.
|align=left|
|-
|Win
|
|align=left| Lee Roy Murphy
|UD
|12
|02/03/1991
|align=left| Darlington, England
|align=left|
|-
|Win
|
|align=left| Ricardo Spain
|TKO
|1
|30/10/1990
|align=left| Chicago Heights, Illinois, U.S.
|align=left|
|-
|Win
|
|align=left| Bill Duncan
|KO
|1
|30/08/1990
|align=left| Boise, Idaho, U.S.
|align=left|
|-
|Loss
|
|align=left| Tony Tucker
|UD
|10
|08/03/1990
|align=left| Inglewood, California, U.S.
|align=left|
|-
|Win
|
|align=left| Monte Masters
|KO
|2
|08/07/1989
|align=left| Harvey, Illinois, U.S.
|align=left|
|-
|Win
|
|align=left| Dave Johnson
|PTS
|10
|25/05/1989
|align=left| Tel Aviv, Israel
|align=left|
|-
|Loss
|
|align=left| Tony Tubbs
|UD
|10
|20/04/1989
|align=left| Redondo Beach, California, U.S.
|align=left|
|-
|Win
|
|align=left| Rodney Stockton
|KO
|4
|09/03/1989
|align=left| Redondo Beach, California, U.S.
|align=left|
|-
|Win
|
|align=left| Joey Christjohn
|TKO
|3
|07/12/1988
|align=left| Harvey, Illinois, U.S.
|align=left|
|-
|Win
|
|align=left| David Jaco
|TKO
|9
|21/05/1988
|align=left| Gary, Indiana, U.S.
|align=left|
|-
|Win
|
|align=left| Steve Zouski
|UD
|10
|11/02/1988
|align=left| Chicago Heights, Illinois, U.S.
|align=left|
|-
|Win
|
|align=left| Steve Zouski
|UD
|10
|01/08/1987
|align=left| Las Vegas, Nevada, U.S.
|align=left|
|-
|Win
|
|align=left| Jack S. Jackson
|KO
|1
|30/06/1987
|align=left| Sterling Heights, Michigan, U.S.
|align=left|
|-
|Win
|
|align=left| Oscar Holman
|UD
|8
|30/05/1987
|align=left| Las Vegas, Nevada, U.S.
|align=left|
|-
|Win
|
|align=left| Mike Cohen
|TKO
|5
|13/12/1986
|align=left| Bethlehem, Pennsylvania, U.S.
|align=left|
|-
|Win
|
|align=left| Dave Slaughter
|TKO
|7
|12/12/1985
|align=left| Chicago Heights, Illinois, U.S.
|align=left|
|-
|Win
|
|align=left| Frank Draper
|TKO
|3
|20/11/1985
|align=left| Erie, Pennsylvania, U.S.
|align=left|
|-
|Win
|
|align=left| Jessie Hicks
|TKO
|5
|21/09/1985
|align=left| Chicago, Illinois, U.S.
|align=left|
|-
|Win
|
|align=left| Wesley Smith
|UD
|6
|08/08/1985
|align=left| Chicago, Illinois, U.S.
|align=left|
|-
|Win
|
|align=left| Larry Roberson
|TKO
|1
|28/06/1985
|align=left| Hammond, Indiana, U.S.
|align=left|
|-
|Win
|
|align=left| Donny Townsend
|TKO
|3
|29/05/1985
|align=left| Merrillville, Indiana, U.S.
|align=left|
|-
|Loss
|
|align=left| Tyrell Biggs
|UD
|6
|15/11/1984
|align=left| New York City, U.S.
|align=left|
|-
|Win
|
|align=left| James Peat
|TKO
|3
|11/08/1984
|align=left| Woodstock, Illinois, U.S.
|align=left|
|-
|Win
|
|align=left| Larry Roberson
|UD
|6
|02/06/1984
|align=left| Chicago Heights, Illinois, U.S.
|align=left|
|-
|Loss
|
|align=left| Ricky Reese
|KO
|1
|26/08/1983
|align=left| Los Angeles, California, U.S.
|align=left|
|-
|Draw
|
|align=left| Frank Garcia
|PTS
|6
|04/08/1983
|align=left| Los Angeles, California, U.S.
|align=left|
|-
|Win
|
|align=left| Dee Collier
|UD
|4
|02/06/1983
|align=left| Los Angeles, California, U.S.
|align=left|
|}

External links
Mike Evans match profile

1959 births
Living people
American male boxers
Heavyweight boxers